William Henry Fry (5 February 1830  – 26 December 1929) was an English-American wood carver and gilder of the Aesthetic Movement. Born in Bath, Somerset, Fry moved to Cincinnati, Ohio in 1849 to work in a shop run by his father, Henry L. Fry. In the 1870s the family began giving private instruction to Cincinnatians on woodcarving techniques.  Many of his wood pieces can be viewed at the Cincinnati Art Museum.

References

External links

1830 births
1929 deaths
People from Bath, Somerset
Artists from Cincinnati
American woodcarvers
English emigrants to the United States